Gan HaDarom (lit. Garden of the South) is a moshav in southern Israel. Located on the coastal plain near Ashdod, it falls under the jurisdiction of Gederot Regional Council.

History
The moshav was founded in 1951 by Jewish refugees from Iraq on Operation Ezra and Nehemiah.

Gan HaDarom was built  the land of the  Palestinian  village of Isdud, which was depopulated in 1948.

The first settlers in Gan HaDarom lived in a ma'abara in neighboring Gan Yavne until the infrastructure was complete for permanent habitation. In 1957–58, twenty new houses were built, and 15 families who arrived from Poland moved into them.
 
Most residents of the modern moshav make their living by working in nearby cities Ashdod and Yavneh. The minority who work in agriculture mainly cultivate poultry, citrus, avocado, and other fruit and vegetables.

References

Moshavim
Populated places established in 1953
 
Iraqi-Jewish culture in Israel
Populated places in Central District (Israel)
1953 establishments in Israel